Varaldsøy is a former municipality in the old Hordaland county, Norway. The municipality existed from 1902 until its dissolution in 1965. The administrative centre of the municipality was the village area of Varaldsøy on the southern part of the island, where Varaldsøy Church is located.

History
On 1 January 1902, the southern district of the municipality of Strandebarm was separated to become the new municipality of Varaldsøy. Initially, Varaldsøy had a population of 848. During the 1960s, there were many municipal mergers across Norway due to the work of the Schei Committee. On 1 January 1965, the municipality of Varaldsøy was dissolved and its lands were split between two neighboring municipalities.  The Mundheim area northwest of the island on the mainland (population: 300) was incorporated into Kvam Municipality, and the island of Varaldsøy and the rest of the mainland area southwest of the island (population: 511) became a part of Kvinnherad Municipality.

Government
All municipalities in Norway, including Varaldsøy, are responsible for primary education (through 10th grade), outpatient health services, senior citizen services, unemployment and other social services, zoning, economic development, and municipal roads.  The municipality is governed by a municipal council of elected representatives, which in turn elects a mayor.

Municipal council
The municipal council  of Varaldsøy was made up of representatives that were elected to four year terms.  The party breakdown of the final municipal council was as follows:

See also
List of former municipalities of Norway

References

Former municipalities of Norway
Kvam
Kvinnherad
1902 establishments in Norway
1965 disestablishments in Norway